Vuyani Pambo is a South African politician. A former student leader of the FeesMustFall movement, he also served as a Member of the National Assembly for the Economic Freedom Fighters (EFF) and a member of the party's Central Command Team. In February 2020, he became the party's new spokesperson. He was previously head of the party's student command at Wits University.

References

External links
 Mr Vuyani Pambo – Parliament of South Africa
 Vuyani Pambo – People's Assembly

Living people
Year of birth missing (living people)
Members of the National Assembly of South Africa
Economic Freedom Fighters politicians
People from Gauteng
People from Soweto